The Performance Marketing Blue Book, owned by privately held , provides online affiliates and merchants with an independently researched ranking of affiliate networks worldwide. It is published in the form of two "Top 20" league tables, one for CPA networks and one for networks using a revenue sharing business model, cost-per-sale. The tables are updated each year from the results of an annual research-based process that includes a survey of over 20,000 online publishers and advertisers. The Blue Book has been produced each year since 2009 and is a recognized information resource within the performance marketing industry.

Methodology
The Blue Book is based upon a research process that incorporates multiple sources of affiliate marketing industry data and includes over 500 affiliate networks each year. One major component is an annual survey of over 20,000 online publishers and merchants. The survey includes anti-fraud security measures to prevent multiple responses from a single individual as well question structured to avoid selection-bias. 
In addition to the survey, the research process aggregates industry expert views, traffic data, measures of industry influence and other information.

The Blue Ribbon Panel
The Blue Ribbon Panel is a group of performance marketing industry experts representing each of the three core parts of the industry: advertisers, publishers and networks. Members are selected on the basis of their experience and reputation. Their opinions are collected via interviews and online survey, and are incorporated into the research process for the Performance Marketing Blue Book.

References

External links
  January 2016, "2016 Blue Book CPA & CPS Network Rankings" Revenue Performance Magazine
  January 2015, "2015 Blue Book CPA & CPS Network Rankings" Revenue+performance magazine, pp 3–4
  January 2016, "2016 CLICKBANK CPA & CPS Network Rankings" Revenue Performance Magazine
  Chris Trayhorn, Winter 2014, "The Best Performance Marketing Networks in The World", Revenue+performance Magazine, pp 8–9
  Joe Ferguson, January 19, 2015, "MaxBounty is Your Number One CPA Network, Again"
 January 16, 2015, "Matomy Ranked a Top-10 CPA Network for Second-Straight Year," 
 Sarah Jones, January 15, 2014 "Affiliate Window Climbs The Blue Book Rankings," Press Release
 What Is Affiliate Management? Affiliate Marketing Info & More Advertise Purple. Retrieved 2021-09-12
 Top 20 CPA and CPS Network Tables Winter 2013, Revenue+performance magazine, p BB 11 & p BB 13
 Effective Platform For Rapidly Increasing Amazon Business On The Planet Retrieved 2022-08-02
 Joey (2020-09-22) How Does Amazon Affiliate Work? Pro Marketing Trends. Retrieved 2020-09-26
 Chris Trayhorn, Winter 2012 "Year of Living Dangerously", Revenue magazine PP BB 2-3
 A Free Advice 77 Best Affiliate Programs For Beginners in 2021 Retrieved 2021-03-03

Online advertising
Affiliate marketing
Online advertising services and affiliate networks